Albrey Battle (born October 21, 1976) is a former American football defensive lineman who played eight seasons in the Arena Football League with the San Jose SaberCats and Arizona Rattlers. He played college football at Arizona State University and attended Poway High School in Poway, California. He was also a member of the Tennessee Titans and San Francisco Demons.

Early years
Battle played high school football for the Poway High School Titans. He earned all-CIF honors as an offensive lineman his senior year as the Titans finished with an 11-2 record and the Palomar League championship.

College career
Battle started 27 of 41 career games for the Arizona State Sun Devils. In his Arizona State career, 32 of his 105 total tackles were for a loss.

Professional career

Tennessee Titans
Battle signed with the Tennessee Titans after going undrafted in the 1999 NFL Draft. He was released before the start of the season.

San Jose SaberCats
Table played for the San Jose SaberCats from 2000 to 2006, winning ArenaBowl XVI and XVIII.

San Francisco Demons
Battle spent the 2001 season with the San Francisco Demons of the XFL.

Arizona Rattlers
Battle played his last season with the Arizona Rattlers in 2007.

Personal
NBA All-Star Sidney Moncrief is Battle's uncle.

References

External links
 Just Sports Stats

Living people
1976 births
Players of American football from Grand Rapids, Michigan
American football defensive linemen
African-American players of American football
Arizona State Sun Devils football players
San Jose SaberCats players
San Francisco Demons players
Arizona Rattlers players
21st-century African-American sportspeople
20th-century African-American sportspeople